Blood In Blood Out (also known as Bound by Honor and Blood In Blood Out: Bound By Honor) is a 1993 American epic crime drama film directed by Taylor Hackford that has become a cult-classic film with a cult following among the Mexican-American community, over the decades. It follows the intertwining lives of three Chicano relatives from 1972 to 1984. They start out as members of a street gang in East Los Angeles, and as dramatic incidents occur, their lives and friendships are forever changed. Blood In Blood Out was filmed in 1991 throughout the Spanish-speaking areas of Los Angeles and inside California's San Quentin State Prison.

Plot 
In 1972, Miklo Velka is the 17-year-old son of a Mexican mother and a white American father. After a violent confrontation with his abusive racist father, Miklo leaves Las Vegas for East Los Angeles, where he stays with his cousins, Paco and Cruz. His cousins are in the local Vatos Locos gang, and Miklo earns his membership during an attack on their rivals, the Tres Puntos. Tres Puntos retaliates by attacking Cruz, permanently damaging his back. When Vatos Locos counterattack the next day, Miklo shoots and kills Spider, leader of Tres Puntos. Fleeing the scene, Paco crashes their car and they are both arrested.

The cousins' paths now diverge: Miklo is imprisoned in San Quentin for murder, Paco volunteers for military service in the Marine Corps in lieu of prison, and Cruz continues his passion for art. Due to his back pain, Cruz develops a heroin addiction, leading to the accidental overdose of his 12-year-old brother, Juanito. After the Marines, Paco joins the L.A.P.D.

Miklo finds San Quentin is run by three racially defined prison gangs. The Black Guerrilla Army (B.G.A.) is led by Bonafide, the Aryan Vanguard is led by Red Ryder, and La Onda is led by Montana Segura. Popeye, a high-ranking member of La Onda, tries to rape Miklo at knife-point, but is stopped by Montana, who finds Popeye's intentions dishonorable. Miklo learns that the only way into La Onda is by killing an enemy inmate. Miklo forms a rapport with Aryan Vanguard associate Big Al, then stabs him to death in the prison kitchen. Now initiated, Miklo rises through the La Onda ranks, eventually joining its Ruling Council.

After serving nine years, Miklo is granted parole. On the outside, disgusted by his menial job (as well as theft and blackmail at the hands of his boss), Miklo joins in an armed robbery. The heist goes poorly and Miklo is intercepted by Paco, who tries to appeal to Miklo to surrender his weapon, so that he can help him out of the situation. Miklo instead starts to flee, and Paco then shoots him in the leg. The leg has to be amputated, and Miklo is sent back to prison.

Miklo notices that cocaine use is now rampant, driven by competing supplies from the B.G.A. and Onda council member Carlos. The Aryan Vanguard want to partner with Carlos as his supplier, offering to help Carlos take B.G.A. out of the cocaine business. Montana, fiercely against La Onda being in the drug trade, warns that the Aryan Vanguard want to start a war between the Black and Chicano inmates. The Council votes in agreement with Montana, so Carlos and a few others leave La Onda to work with Aryan Vanguard.

Carlos has his non-inmate brother, Smokey, bomb the B.G.A.'s drug supply hangout in the city. Carlos also kills "Pockets", who is running the B.G.A.'s operation in San Quentin. As Montana warned, the Aryan Vanguard then lets the B.G.A. murder Carlos.

With hostility high between the Blacks and Chicanos, Montana and Bonafide meet in the prison yard. Montana convinces Bonafide to agree to a truce if Montana reaches out to La Onda leaders in other prisons to end the violence. The warden grants Montana special permission to visit the prisons and Miklo is left in charge.

Montana is granted a special request to have his daughter visit him at one of the prisons. Before she arrives, Montana is stabbed to death by a member of the B.G.A. Believing the Aryan Vanguard sent forged orders to the hitman, Paco arranges a peace conference between La Onda and B.G.A., but Miklo uses the talks to build an alliance with B.G.A. and plan the joint killing of Aryan Vanguard leaders. After the Aryan Vanguard are dead, Miklo's men promptly exterminate the B.G.A. leaders as well. A furious Paco confronts Miklo, disowning him forever.

The warden vows to split La Onda's ruling council by sending them to the prisons in other states. Miklo uses this to expand La Onda across the South West. It is later revealed that Magic, not the Aryan Vanguard, sent the forged orders to have B.G.A. kill Montana. This was set up by a reluctant Miklo, who clashed with Montana on the direction that La Onda should take for the gang's future. As Miklo destroys the evidence of their betrayal, Magic (who for a short time bullied Miklo during the latter's first year in prison) swears his life to Miklo as his jefe.

Back in East Los Angeles, Paco visits one of Cruz' murals, showing a portrait of his former life. In a pep talk with Cruz, Paco realizes that by ordering Miklo to go after Spider, Paco is responsible for what Miklo has become. He ultimately forgives Miklo.

Cast

Production 
The origin for “Blood In . . . Blood Out” had its genesis in the early 1980s when producer Jerry Gershwin hired novelist Ross Thomas to write the first script, which initially went into development at New Visions Pictures under director Harold Becker.

Actor Edward James Olmos was offered the chance to both direct and star in the film, but due to creative differences, Olmos turned down the project. Other actors considered for roles in the film included Andy García, Lou Diamond Phillips, and Sean Penn.

After New Visions Pictures folded, Producer Taylor Hackford would take over directing duties. Screenwriter Floyd Mutrux was then brought on to do a script rewrite, as did screenwriter Jeremy Iacone, and writer/poet Jimmy Santiago Baca, whom Hackford credits with contributing most of the final story, which Baca had based on his life experiences.

The three prison gangs in the film are fictional creations of screenwriter Jimmy Santiago Baca and director Taylor Hackford. However, they were all loosely based on actual prison gangs, with the Aryan Vanguard, Black Guerrilla Army and La Onda representing the Aryan Brotherhood, Black Guerrilla Family, and the Mexican Mafia, respectively.

Actor Theodore Wilson died shortly after filming his scenes in the film.

Artist Adan Hernandez was hired to create the paintings the character of Cruz Candelaria was supposed to have painted. All of the paintings that were used in the film were created by him. A rumor circulated over the mural in the reservoir seen in the film's climax. Some believed that the mural has since been painted over. The truth, however, is the producers did not have permission to paint the mural on the reservoir wall. What the producers did was ask a local artist to paint the mural on plywood which they placed in front of the wall, giving the illusion that the mural was painted on the wall. The producers got the ok to leave the mural up for a few months after the movie release. The artist who painted the mural was allowed to take the painting down. The painting was disassembled into four parts. Adan Hernandez passed away on May 17, 2021, his family has the original painting. Hernandez made a cameo appearance in the film as the drug dealer Gilbert in the art gallery scene.

The film was shot in and around Los Angeles and East Los Angeles and inside the walls of San Quentin State Prison. The main character Miklo is sent to San Quentin, where much of the film's plot takes place. Several of the then-inmates appear in the film as extras. In addition, several of the prison staff members also appear as others and some facilitated the production of the film by serving as technical advisors. Many members of the staff were given small lines in the film, with the warden giving an extended cameo in a part that is somewhat integral to the plot. In addition, actor Danny Trejo, who appears in the film as Geronimo, had served time in San Quentin before deciding to become an actor.

In addition to prison inmates and staff and artist Hernandez, screenwriter and barrio poet Jimmy Santiago Baca cameos as a prison inmate and member of the La Onda council.

The film was initially entitled Blood in Blood Out, but was retitled Bound by Honor before the film's release. 'Blood in blood out' refers to the initiation ritual of having to kill someone to enter a gang and, on the reverse end, not being able to leave the gang unless killed. This is a common initiation in many gangs, including prison gangs, and is also the motto of La Onda in the film. Hollywood Pictures insisted on the name change as the studio felt that the original title might incite violence in East Los Angeles. In addition, executives at Hollywood Pictures, a division of The Walt Disney Studios, were concerned about the potential effect the 1993 film could have on Los Angeles following the 1992 LA Riots, especially after the attribution that was given to Boyz n the Hood as a partial cause of or inspiration for the civil unrest. Director Taylor Hackford has stated that he was very unhappy with this decision, as the film's message was the exact opposite of the one that the studio feared could be transmitted.

Reception

Release 
In early 1993, the film and its marketing campaign were given a week-long test run, playing at two or three theaters in several cities across the country, including: Rochester, New York and Tucson, Arizona, early test-screening audiences responded positively. However, at a screening in Las Vegas, Nevada, theater managers had called in the police to break up a fistfight between two couples, twenty minutes before the film was to start, according to Hackford, this incident caused the studio to rethink the marketing campaign for the film.

The film was released nationally on thirty screens on April 30, 1993, but delayed in the Los Angeles markets until May 21, 1993, when the Rodney King civil rights trial verdict was to be handed down, the city feared a repeat of the 1992 riots following the acquittal of four Los Angeles Police Department officers charged with beating King.

Box office 
The box-office sales totaled $1 million from 391 theaters on opening weekend. Distributors did not plan to expand the release further, as crossover appeal to non-Hispanic audiences was not apparent.

Critical response 
The film received mixed reviews from critics. On Rotten Tomatoes it has an approval rating of 55% based on reviews from 11 critics, with an average rating of 5.48/10. On Metacritic it has a weighted average score of 47 out of 100 based on reviews from 12 critics, indicating "mixed or average reviews".

Kenneth Turan of the Los Angeles Times was critical of the film, called it "approximately three hours of violent, cartoonish posturing incongruously set in the realistically evoked milieu of East Los Angeles", while Mim Eichler, also of the Los Angeles Times, praised the film, calling it "A riveting odyssey, rich with myth and unforgettable imagery. It is a feast of sight and sound--poetry, music, dance and emotion--and possibly one of the most powerful and important films of the decade".

The TV Guide review stated "similarity to Edward James Olmos' American Me, in which a tormented drug dealer travels the same route through prison society as Miklo. The principal difference between the two films is that Bound By Honor is by far the glossier effort, relentlessly picturesque in the seamlessly anesthetized manner of mainstream Hollywood films." Film critic Jonathan Rosenbaum for the Chicago Reader wrote that this "ugly three-hour snoozefest is apparently supposed to do for East Los Angeles Chicanos what the Godfather movies did for New York mafiosi…" Roger Ebert wrote "The East Los Angeles milieu and some of the characters seem familiar, because some of the same ground was covered by American Me... Bound by Honor covers similar material in a less passionate and finally less meaningful way." He gave the film 2 stars out of 4.

Owen Gleiberman of Entertainment Weekly gave Bound By Honor a B−, falling on the high end of the film spectrum.  He states "Bound By Honor comes fully alive when it moves behind bars. There's an exploitative thrill built into the genre…" Gleiberman was more interested in the second half of the film once Miklo was in jail running La Onda. Vincent Canby of The New York Times wrote "The film is big and long, passionate and flat. It's full of heroic and tragic incident, but skimpy about the details of quotidian lives." Canby exalts some of the characters in the film one in particular, Enrique Castillo. Although Vincent Canby does not give an official rating for the film, he concludes "Though it's not the epic it means to be, it is not a failure."

See also 
 South Central
 List of hood films

References

External links 
 
 
 
 

1990s English-language films
1993 crime drama films
1993 crime thriller films
1993 films
American prison drama films
Films about drugs
Films directed by Taylor Hackford
Films scored by Bill Conti
Films set in Los Angeles
Films set in San Quentin State Prison
Films set in the 1970s
Films set in the 1980s
Films shot in San Quentin, California
Films with screenplays by Floyd Mutrux
Hispanic and Latino American drama films
Hollywood Pictures films
Hood films
Films about Mexican Americans
Spanish-language American films
1990s American films